Madeleine Campbell (born 18 August 1964) is a British swimmer. She competed in two events at the 1992 Summer Olympics.

References

External links
 

1964 births
Living people
British female swimmers
Olympic swimmers of Great Britain
Swimmers at the 1992 Summer Olympics
Sportspeople from Portsmouth
20th-century British women
21st-century British women